Guelph is a provincial electoral district in southwestern Ontario, Canada. It has been represented in the Legislative Assembly of Ontario from 1987 until 1999, and again from 2007 to present. The riding was created from portions of the Guelph—Wellington riding. The riding includes all of the city of Guelph.

Members of Provincial Parliament

Election results

2022 election

At the 2022 election, the Greens polled the most votes in all but four polling divisions across the riding.

2018 election

2007 electoral reform referendum

References

Sources
Elections Ontario Past Election Results
Map of riding for 2018 election

Ontario provincial electoral districts
Politics of Guelph